Mount Stuart is a mountain, 1,995 m, standing  north of Mount VX-6, in the Monument Nunataks. It was named by Advisory Committee on Antarctic Names (US-ACAN) for Alfred Wright Stuart, glaciologist and member of the United States Antarctic Research Program (USARP) Victoria Land Traverse Party which surveyed this area in 1959–1960.

Stuart, Mount